Demetre of Georgia may refer to:

 Demetrius I of Georgia, King in 1125–1156
 Demetrius II of Georgia, King in 1270–1289